Michail Elgin and Alexandre Kudryavtsev were the defending champions, but decided not to participate.
Konstantin Kravchuk and Denys Molchanov won the title, defeating Adrian Mannarino and Maxime Teixeira 6–3, 6–3 in the final.

Seeds

Draw

Draw

References
 Main draw

Doubles
2012